Virgin Radio 93.7 was launched at City Mall in Amman, Jordan on 24 November 2009. 

Following the Dubai launch of Virgin Radio in 2008, Virgin Radio Jordan is the second Virgin Radio station in the Middle East region.

The station will continue its broadcast under its new name: Star FM.

References

External links
Star 93.7 Jordan

Radio stations in Jordan
Mass media in Amman
Virgin Radio
Radio stations established in 2009